Il bidone   The Swindle is a 1955 Italian drama film directed by Federico Fellini starring Broderick Crawford, Richard Basehart and Giulietta Masina.

Plot
In the country outside Rome, a group of swindlers dress up as clerics and con poor farmers out of their savings. Another scam in a shanty town is to pretend they are officials taking deposits for apartments. The proceeds are spent on flashy cars, champagne and prostitutes.

One member of the gang, Carlo – nicknamed Picasso in being an aspiring artist – pretends to his faithful wife Iris that he is a traveling salesman, but she gradually stops believing him. His conscience is pricked and he decides to quit. Another member, Augusto, meets his teenage daughter Patrizia who he has not seen for years, and his conscience is also awakened. However he is recognized in a cinema with her, arrested and jailed.

When released he joins a new gang to work the clergy scam among peasants. After swindling a large sum out of a farming family, he talks to their polio-afflicted teenage daughter. Her plight touches him, and when the gang come to share out the gains he says he gave it all back. A row develops and he is battered to the ground. Stripping him, the crooks find he has concealed the takings in his clothes. On a snowy hillside, they leave him to a slow death.

Cast
 Broderick Crawford as Augusto Rocco
 Giulietta Masina as Iris
 Richard Basehart as Carlo
 Franco Fabrizi as Roberto Giorgio
 Sue Ellen Blake as Anna
 Irene Cefaro as Marisa
 Alberto De Amicis as Rinaldo
 Lorella De Luca as Patrizia
 Giacomo Gabrielli as Il Baron Vargas
 Riccardo Garrone as Riccardo
 Xenia Valderi

Production
Fellini had originally intended Humphrey Bogart for the role of Augusto, but, learning of Bogart being ill with cancer, finally chose Broderick Crawford for the part.

Reception
On the occasion of its 9 year delayed US premiere, critic Bosley Crowther gave the film a mixed review, calling it "a cheap crime thriller." He added, "For this film, which is often mentioned in estimations of the master's works, is notable as a false step in his movement toward the development of a type of story material ... But it contains some very strong Fellini phases and accumulations of moods that make it well worth seeing. And it is generally well played ... Broderick Crawford's performance as the swindler is heavy and sodden, with a particular flair for postured histrionics in the swindle scenes."

References

External links
 
 
 
 

1955 films
1955 crime drama films
Italian black-and-white films
Films scored by Nino Rota
Films directed by Federico Fellini
Italian crime drama films
1950s Italian-language films
English-language Italian films
1950s English-language films
Titanus films
Films about con artists
Films with screenplays by Federico Fellini
1950s multilingual films
Italian multilingual films
1950s Italian films